The Juno Awards of 1999 honouring Canadian music industry achievements were held in Hamilton, Ontario, Canada. The primary ceremonies at Copps Coliseum on 7 March 1999 were broadcast by CBC Television and hosted by Mike Bullard.

Nominations were announced 27 January 1999 from the Glenn Gould Studio in Toronto.

CBC technicians under the Communications, Energy and Paperworkers Union of Canada were on strike in early 1999. However, the union chose not to picket the Juno Awards broadcast.

Luc Plamondon was inducted into the Canadian Music Hall of Fame.

Nominees and winners

Best Female Vocalist
Winner: Celine Dion

Other Nominees:
Holly Cole
Deborah Cox
Lynda Lemay
Ginette Reno

Best Male Vocalist
Winner: Jim Cuddy

Other Nominees:
Corey Hart
Colin James
Kevin Parent
David Usher

Best New Solo Artist
Winner: Melanie Doane

Other Nominees:
Emm Gryner
Bruce Guthro
Hayden
Tamia

Best Group
Winner: Barenaked Ladies

Other Nominees:
Matthew Good Band
Philosopher Kings
The Rankins
The Tragically Hip

Best New Group
Winner: Johnny Favourite Swing Orchestra

Other Nominees:
Love Inc.
The Moffatts
New Meanies
The Wilkinsons

Best Songwriter
Winner: Bryan Adams, "On a Day Like Today" with Phil Thornalley, "When You're Gone" with Eliot Kennedy

Other Nominees:
 Loreena McKennitt, "The Mummer's Dance"
 Ed Robertson, "One Week"
 Amy Sky, "Love Pain and the Whole Damn Thing" and "Heaven" (both with Steven MacKinnon), "Ordinary Miracles" with David Pickell
 Shania Twain, "Don't Be Stupid (You Know I Love You)", "From This Moment On", "You're Still the One" (all with Robert John "Mutt" Lange)

Best Country Female Vocalist
Winner: Shania Twain

Other Nominees:
Lisa Brokop
Tracey Brown
Terri Clark
Beverley Mahood

Best Country Male Vocalist
Winner: Paul Brandt

Other Nominees:
Chris Cummings
Jason McCoy
Duane Steele
Jamie Warren

Best Country Group or Duo
Winner: Leahy

Other Nominees:
Farmer's Daughter
Prairie Oyster
Thomas Wade and Wayward
The Wilkinsons

International Achievement Award
Winner: Celine Dion

Best Producer
Winner: Colin James "Let's Shout" (with co-producer Joe Hardy) and "C'mon With The C'mon"

Other Nominees:
Bryan Adams (with Bob Rock), "C'mon, C'mon, C'mon", "How Do Ya Feel Tonight" both by Bryan Adams
Bruce Fairbairn, "Within" and "I Finally Found My Way" by Kiss
David Foster, "I Never Loved You Anyway" by The Corrs and "Have You Ever?" by Brandy
Daniel Lanois, "The Maker" by Willie Nelson

Best Recording Engineer
Winner: Kevin Doyle, "Stanstill" by various artists and  "Soul On Soul" by Amy Sky

Other Nominees:
Lenny DeRose, "Hurts to Love You" and "You Stepped on My Life" by Philosopher Kings
Ormond Jobin, "Desperately" and "If We Had Never Met" by Shirley Eikhard
Randy Staub, "C'mon, C'mon, C'mon" by Bryan Adams and "Radio" by Copyright
John Whynot, "Disappointment" and "All in Time" by Jim Cuddy

Canadian Music Hall of Fame
Winner: Luc Plamondon

Walt Grealis Special Achievement Award
Winner: Allan Waters

Nominated and winning albums

Best Album
Winner: Let's Talk About Love, Celine Dion

Other Nominees:
The Book of Secrets, Loreena McKennitt
Grand parleur petit faiseur, Kevin Parent
Happy?, Jann Arden
Phantom Power, The Tragically Hip

Best Alternative Album
Winner: Rufus Wainwright, Rufus Wainwright

Other Nominees:
Breath from Another, Esthero
Bring Yourself Up, Bodega
BTK, BTK
The Closer I Get, Hayden

Best Blues Album
Winner: Blues Weather, Fathead

Other Nominees:
Big Boy, Carlos del Junco
Blues Boss Boogie, Kenny "Blues Boss" Wayne
Blues Money, Michael Pickett
Colin James and the Little Big Band II, Colin James

Best Children's Album
Winner: Mozart's Magnificent Voyage, Susan Hammond's Classical Kids

Other Nominees:
Accordelidon, Danielle Martineau
Celebrate the Music, Sandra Beech
If Fish Could Sing, Teresa Doyle
Musical Mystery Machines, Ken Whiteley

Best Classical Album (Solo or Chamber Ensemble)
Winner: Bach: Well-Tempered Clavier - Book 1, Angela Hewitt

Other Nominees:
Dvorak, Mendelssohn: Piano Trios, The Gryphon Trio
In Brahms' Apartment, Amici Ensemble
Medtner: The Complete Piano Sonatas, Marc-André Hamelin
Telemann: Tafelmusik, Ensemble Arion

Best Classical Album (Large Ensemble)
Winner: Handel: Music For The Royal Fireworks, Tafelmusik, Jeanne Lamon (musical director)

Other Nominees:
Bartok: Dance Suite, Music for Strings, Toronto Symphony Orchestra
Reverie et Caprice: Violin Romances, Chantal Juillet, Orchestre Symphonique de Montreal
Saint-Saëens - Fauré - Roussel, Stéphane Lemelin, CBC Vancouver Orchestra
Schnittke, Part, Gorecki, I Musici de Montreal

Best Classical Album (Vocal or Choral Performance)
Winner: Songs of Travel, Gerald Finley (baritone) and Stephen Ralls (piano)

Other Nominees:
A Britten Serenade, Manitoba Chamber Orchestra, Henriette Schellenberg (soprano), Benjamin Butterfield (tenor), James Sommerville (horn)
Messiah: The Complete Choruses, Tafelmusik Chamber Choir and Orchestra
Musica Intima, Musica Intima
Vivaldi: Motets for Soprano, Karina Gauvin (soprano)

Best Album Design
Winner: Andrew McLachlan, Rob Baker, Brock Ostrom, Bernard Clark, David Ajax, Phantom Power by The Tragically Hip

Other Nominees:
David Ashcroft, Ivan Otis, Margaret Malandruccolo, Three Seeds by New Meanies
Steve Goode, David Anthony, Since When by 54-40
John Rummen, Jay Blakesburg, Stunt by Barenaked Ladies
Hugh Syme, Geddy Lee, Andrew MacNaughton, Different Stages by Rush

Best Gospel Album
Winner: Life Is, Sharon Riley and Faith Chorale

Other Nominees:
Follow Him, Toronto Mass Choir
Listen to the Sound, Lianna Klassen
Our Message, Selections
To Whom It May Concern, Expression of Praise

Best Selling Francophone Album
Winner: S'il suffisait d'aimer, Celine Dion

Other Nominees:
L'Album du peuple, volume 1, François Perusse
Enchantée, Carmen Campagne
Grand parleur petit faiseur, Kevin Parent
Lynda Lemay, Lynda Lemay

Best Instrumental Album
Winner: My Roots are Showing, Natalie MacMaster

Other Nominees:
Celtic Awakening, Howard Baer, Dan Gibson
Celtic Dance, Casadh An tSúgáin (composers Oliver Schroer, John Herberman)
Vertigo, Jesse Cook
Whispering Woods, David Bradstreet, Dan Gibson

Best Selling Album (Foreign or Domestic)
Winner: Let's Talk About Love, Céline Dion

Other Nominees:
Come On Over, Shania Twain
Ray of Light, Madonna
Spiceworld, Spice Girls
Titanic, Music from the Motion Picture, James Horner

Best Mainstream Jazz Album
Winner: The Atlantic Sessions, Kirk MacDonald

Other Nominees:
 Cactus, François Bourassa
 Inner Urge, Dave Young Trio
 Kenny and Sonny Live at the Montreal Bistro, The Kenny Wheeler, Sonny Greenwich Quintet
 Siren's Song, Kenny Wheeler, Norma Winstone, John Taylor and the Maritime Jazz Orchestra

Best Contemporary Jazz Album
Winner: Metalwood 2, Metalwood

Other Nominees:
 Cruel Yet Fair, Hard Rubber Orchestra
 In the Vernacular: The Music of John Carter, François Houle
 Road Stories, Phil Dwyer
 You Are Here, Neufeld-Occhipinti Jazz Orchestra

Best Roots or Traditional Album - Group
Winner: The McGarrigle Hour, Kate & Anna McGarrigle

Other Nominees:
 Heartbreak Hill, Heartbreak Hill
 Matapat, Bourque, Bernard et Lepage
 Return of the Wanderer, Puirt a Baroque
 Strang, Zubot & Dawson

Best Roots or Traditional Album - Solo
Winner: Heartstrings, Willie P. Bennett

Other Nominees:
 Crazy Old Man, Roy Forbes
 My Roots Are Showing, Natalie MacMaster
 Sally's Dream, Bill Bourne
 Stones, Gordie Sampson

Best Pop Album
Winner: Stunt, Barenaked Ladies

Other Nominees:
Chapter 1: A New Beginning, The Moffatts
Famous, Rich and Beautiful, Philosopher Kings
Grand parleur petit faiseur, Kevin Parent
Happy?, Jann Arden
Let's Talk About Love, Celine Dion

Best Rock Album
Winner: Phantom Power, The Tragically Hip

Other Nominees:
Navy Blues, Sloan
Silent Radar, The Watchmen
Since When, 54-40
Underdogs, Matthew Good Band

Nominated and winning releases

Best Single
Winner: "One Week", Barenaked Ladies

Other Nominees:
 "Adia", Sarah McLachlan
 "Apparitions", Matthew Good Band
 "Hurts To Love You", Philosopher Kings
 "My Heart Will Go On", Celine Dion

Best Classical Composition
Winner: "Concerto For Wind Orchestra", Colin McPhee

Other Nominees:
 "Sonata for Viola and Piano". Chris Harman
 "Songs for an Acrobat". Linda Bouchard
 "Tre Vie". Malcolm Forsyth
 "Wine of Peace: Two Songs for Soprano and Orchestra". John Weinzweig

Best Rap Recording
Winner: Northern Touch by Rascalz featuring Choclair, Kardinal Offishall, Thrust, and Checkmate

Other Nominees:
Built to Last, Maestro
The Epic, Citizen Kane
Frankenstein UV, Frankenstein
Ghetto Concept, The Album, Ghetto Concept

Best R&B/Soul Recording
Winner: One Wish by Deborah Cox

Other Nominees:
Bout Your Love, Glenn Lewis
I Need Some Time, Kirsten Farkollie
Rally'n, Jully Black featuring Saukrates
Tamia, Tamia

Best Music of Aboriginal Canada Recording
Winner: Contact from the Underworld of Redboy, Robbie Robertson

Other Nominees:
Hearts of the Nations, The 1997 Aboriginal Women's Voices Group
Message from a Drum, J. Hubert Francis and Eagle Feather
Thirst, Jani Lauzon
Welcome to the Playground, TKO

Best Reggae/Calypso Recording
Winner: Vision, Frankie Wilmot

Other Nominees:
Chains and Shackles, Inspector Lenny
Glorious Ride, Lazah Current
The Original, DJ Ray
The Way I Feel, Mystics

Best Global Album
Winner: The Message, Alpha Yaya Diallo

Other Nominees:
 Endless, Silk Road Music
 Karsilama, Karsilama
 Por El Sol, Diego Marulanda & Pacande
 Vertigo, Jesse Cook

Best Dance Recording
Winner: Broken Bones, Love Inc.

Other Nominees:
Hands of Time, Temperance
I Got What It Takes, Jacynthe
Popcorn, The Boomtang Boys
Try My Love, Shauna Davis

Best Video
Winner: Javier Aguilera, "Forestfire" by David Usher

Other Nominees:
 Ulf Buddensieck, "Lukey" by Great Big Sea and The Chieftains
 Bill Morrison, "Apparitions" by Matthew Good Band
 Floria Sigismondi, "Sweet Surrender" by Sarah McLachlan
 Jeth Weinrich, "Wishing That" by Jann Arden

References

External links

Juno Awards site

1999
1999 music awards
1999 in Canadian music
History of Hamilton, Ontario
20th century in Hamilton, Ontario